Senior Women's National Football Championship is the women's football tournament which is contested by state associations and government institutions in India. The first edition was held in 1991 and is organized by the All India Football Federation to crown the national women's football champion each year. It is based on a league and knockout format.

Format 
The format consists of zonal group stages where all the state teams participate. It is followed by the final round. The season consists of:

 Group stage
 Final round

When the number of teams is known, those are divided into eight groups with equal number of teams. The preliminary qualifying league will be played on a single leg league basis. The eight winners move on to the two quarter final leagues. That is played as a single leg league, with the best two teams of each group qualifying for the semi finals stage. From there on it is a knock out format with single leg matches.
Tie breakers in the league stages are:

 Superior number of points in all matches
 Superior number of points in matches of tied teams
 Superior goal difference
 Superior number of goal scored
 Drawing of lots

Results

The following is the list of winners and runners-up from every edition of the Championship

Final appearances

References

External links
 Official website

Senior Women's National Football Championship
Women's football leagues in India
Women's football competitions in India